Feuilles d'Album, S.165, is a solo piano piece in A-flat major by Hungarian composer and virtuoso pianist Franz Liszt, composed in 1841 and published in 1844 by Schott frères. It is dedicated to his friend, Gustave Du Bousquet. A performance takes about 2 1/2 minutes.

External links
 
 

Compositions by Franz Liszt
Compositions for solo piano
1841 compositions
Compositions in A-flat major
Music dedicated to family or friends